Elections were held on 17 September 1970 to elect members of the fourth Niyamasabha. The United Front, led by CPI, IUML, RSP, and with the external support from INC, won plurality of seats and formed the government, with C. Achutha Menon as the Chief Minister.

Results

Party Wise Results

Constituency Wise Results

References

External links 
 Kerala Assembly Election DATABASE

Kerala
State Assembly elections in Kerala
1970s in Kerala